Lawrynomyces is a genus of fungi in the Rickenella-clade of the order Hymenochaetales, containing the single species Lawrynomyces capitatus.

References

Hymenochaetales
Monotypic Basidiomycota genera